Marlow Cook (1926–2016) was a U.S. Senator from Kentucky from 1968 to 1974. Senator Cook may also refer to:

Bill Cook (politician) (born 1945), North Carolina State Senate
Burton C. Cook (1819–1894), Illinois State Senate
Charles D. Cook (1935–2001), New York State Senate
Charles Cook (New York politician) (1800–1866), New York State Senate
Dwight Cook (born 1951), North Dakota State Senate
Elijah Fox Cook (1805–1886), Michigan State Senate
George W. F. Cook (1919–2009), Vermont State Senate
Howard C. Cook (1918–1983), Ohio State Senate
James M. Cook (1807–1868), New York State Senate
John Parsons Cook (1817–1872), Iowa State Senate
John Cook (governor) (1730–1789), Delaware State Senate
Tanya Cook (born 1964), Nebraska State Senate
Willis C. Cook (1874–1942), South Dakota State Senate
Zadock Cook (1769–1863), Georgia State Senate

See also
Senator Cooke (disambiguation)